Trần Danh Trung (born 3 October 2000) is a Vietnamese professional footballer who plays for V.League 1 club Viettel and the Vietnam national under-23 team.

International goals

Vietnam U19

Vietnam U22

Honours
Viettel
V.League 1: 2020 
Vietnamese National Cup: Runner-up: 2020
Vietnamese Super Cup: Runner-up: 2020

References

External links
 

2000 births
Living people
People from Thừa Thiên-Huế province
Vietnamese footballers
Viettel FC players
V.League 1 players
Vietnam international footballers
Association football forwards